The 2018–19 season was Millwall's 134th year in existence, 93rd consecutive season in The Football League, and 42nd in the second tier. Millwall competed in the Championship, FA Cup, and League Cup. This season Millwall broke their club transfer fee record that they've paid for a player twice, firstly buying Tom Bradshaw from Barnsley for £1.25 million, and then a week later buying midfielder Ryan Leonard from Sheffield United for £1.5 million. They also broke the record received for a player, selling George Saville to Middlesbrough for £8 million. Millwall knocked out Premier League side Everton on the way to reaching the FA Cup Quarter-final for the eleventh time in their history. Millwall spent the majority of the season in a relegation battle, securing their place in the Championship with two games to spare at the expense of Rotherham. The season covers the period from 1 July 2018 to 30 June 2019.

Pre-season

Friendlies
Millwall announced pre-season friendlies against Dartford, Cambridge United Colchester United and VfL Bochum.

Competitions

Championship

League table

Results by matchday

Result summary

Matches
On 21 June 2018, the Championship fixtures for the forthcoming season were announced.

FA Cup

The third round draw was made live on BBC by Ruud Gullit and Paul Ince from Stamford Bridge on 3 December 2018. The fourth round draw was made live on BBC by Robbie Keane and Carl Ikeme from Wolverhampton on 7 January 2019. The fifth round draw was broadcast on 28 January 2019 live on BBC, Alex Scott and Ian Wright conducted the draw. Draw for the quarter-final was made on 18 February by Darren Fletcher & Wayne Bridge.

EFL Cup

On 15 June 2018, the draw for the first round was made in Vietnam. The second round draw was made from the Stadium of Light on 16 August. The third round draw was made on 30 August 2018 by David Seaman and Joleon Lescott.

Squad

Statistics

|-
!colspan=15|Players who left the club:

|}

Goals record

Disciplinary record

Transfers

Transfers in

Transfers out

Loans in

Loans out

References

Millwall
Millwall F.C. seasons